The Scorpion King 2: Rise of a Warrior is a 2008 American direct-to-DVD sword and sorcery action adventure film prequel to the 2002 film The Scorpion King, itself a prequel to the 1999 reimagining of The Mummy. Filming for the film began on October 1, 2007, in Cape Town, South Africa. The film had a scheduled release date of August 19, 2008, in the United States, and was released on Blu-ray Disc and DVD.

When young Mathayus witnesses his father's death at the hands of an evil military commander, his quest for vengeance transforms him into the most feared warrior of the prehistoric world.

Plot
Mathayus aims to avenge the death of his father at the hand of Sargon, now king of Akkad, by taking service in his Black Scorpions squad. After completing his training he is tasked by Sargon to kill Noah, Mathayus's own brother. He saves him and escapes the city, but a magic arrow follows them and kills Noah.

Mathayus boards a ship to Egypt, accompanied by his childhood friend Layla. He intends to get the Spear of Osiris in Egypt, which he believes will be able to pass through Sargon's black magic protection. A fellow traveller, Greek poet Aristophanes (Ari), tells Mathayus and Layla that the Spear only kills Egyptian creatures, but the Sword of Damocles will work. The trio travels to Greece, where they can enter the Underworld to retrieve the Sword of Damocles. On the way, they fall into a cell and are surrounded by men left as sacrifices for the Minotaur. Some of the sacrifices are mercenaries who owe allegiance to Mathayus' father, so they help him and Layla to defeat the Minotaur, with help from a Chinese captive named Fung.

The enlarged group travel to the Underworld, where they are attacked by the goddess Astarte. Layla and Astarte fight, while Fung and Ari search for and find the sword. Astarte tries to send Layla to hell, but Mathayus frees her, and they all escape to the human realm.

Astarte orders Sargon to get her sword back, and he asks for more dark powers. The group reach Akkad, where Sargon turns on a machine that dumps oil into the water supply. The oil and water begin to flow through statues into the city, which is then set on fire.

Using the Sword of Damocles, Mathayus fights through to Sargon but finds his own father, who turns out to be Sargon in disguise. Sargon uses the confusion to disarm Mathayus and they begin fighting. Ari picks up the sword then hands it to Sargon, revealing that he had been bribing Ari with riches. More chaos and fighting ensues in the city and we learn that the sword that Ari gave Sargon was a fake and easily shattered. Ari bursts in and gives Mathayus the real sword. When Sargon states Mathayus owes him his loyalty as a black scorpion, Mathayus burns off his scorpion tattoo with the sword as Sargon retreats into the shadows.

Sargon turns into a giant near-invisible scorpion and continues his attack. Mathayus impales the Scorpion King Sargon with the Sword of Damocles. Layla manages to put out the fires while Fung fights and eliminates several of Sargon's soldiers. Astarte tells Mathayus that she will show him no mercy, but Mathayus tells her that she will have him one day. Mathayus awakens in a bed after being nursed by Layla, who then tells him that he has won the right to be king, but he decides for now to head off on a life of adventure, knowing one day he shall be the Scorpion King.

Cast
 Michael Copon as Mathayus
 Pierre Marais as Young Mathayus
 Karen David as Layla
 Simon Quarterman as Ari
 Tom Wu as Fong
 Andreas Wisniewski as Pollux
 Randy Couture as Sargon / Sarkhan
 Natalie Becker as Astarte
 Jeremy Crutchley as Baldo
 Shane Manie as Jesup

Production
In August 2007, it was reported that Dwayne "The Rock" Johnson would not reprise his role, but instead, Michael Copon was cast as the young Mathayus, Karen David as the lead heroine, Layla, and Randy Couture as the main villain, Sargon.

Reception

Critical response

Beyond Hollywood said "the film is a complete loss, you have to wonder what the filmmakers could have done with a better script, a better cast, and a director who isn't so hit-and-miss as to be infuriating." Aaron Peck of Blog Critics said, "I really wanted to like this movie. The first Scorpion King is a laugh-fest yes, but it's fun to watch. This movie is painful."

Keith Uhlich of UGO said the film is "cheap, ugly, deadening, lacking even the common decency to be unintentionally funny, [the] sheer ineptitude increas[ing] with each passing scene." Film Jabber said The Scorpion King 2 "lacks action, excitement and, more importantly, quality," adding: "While the production values are decent enough for a film like this, you can tell from minute one that this movie was made simply to coincide with the theatrical release of The Mummy: Tomb of the Dragon Emperor." Mark Pollard of Kung Fu Cinema said that "the lead actors [keep] the movie marginally entertaining long after the predictable plot, generic effects work, and poorly-edited screen fighting grows weary."

Sam Sloan of A Slice of Sci-Fi, said the film is "a notch up in quality from what is typically seen on a Saturday night from the Sci-Fi Channel," remarking that director Russell Mulcahy "was able to turn what should have been a totally dreadful movie into a watchable film that didn't make me feel like I had completely wasted an hour and a half of my time." Kenneth Brown of Hi-Def Digest said The Scorpion King 2 "feels like an aborted TV pilot, [...] painfully overplotted, yet so mind-numbingly simple that it's impossible to care about its characters or central conflicts."

Christopher Monfette  of IGN gave it six out of ten, and judging it compared to other direct-to-DVD films said "everybody involved was at the very least aiming for something worthwhile, and though the effort doesn't always translate, there's an entertaining movie here if you can keep your perspective intact."

The film earned $12,093,296	in home media sales.

Sequel

A sequel entitled The Scorpion King 3: Battle for Redemption was released on 10 January 2012 on DVD and Blu-ray Disc with Victor Webster as Mathayus.

References

External links

 
 
 

2008 films
2008 action films
2000s fantasy adventure films
American action adventure films
American fantasy adventure films
Direct-to-video prequel films
Films scored by Klaus Badelt
Films directed by Russell Mulcahy
Films produced by James Jacks
Films set in ancient Egypt
Films shot in South Africa
German action adventure films
The Mummy (franchise)
The Scorpion King (film series)
South African action films
American swashbuckler films
American sword and sorcery films
Universal Pictures direct-to-video films
Ancient Mesopotamia in popular culture
Astarte
2000s English-language films
English-language German films
English-language South African films
2000s American films
American prequel films
German prequel films
2000s German films